Sotis Volanis (Greek: Σώτης Βολάνης, born Sotiris Stavridis in 20 February 1971) is a Greek singer. He was born in Akrolimni, Pella, Greece.

He is best known for his 2002 success Poso Mou Leipei (i zesti ankalia sou) (Greek: Πόσο μου λείπει η ζεστή αγκαλιά σου), English How much I miss your warm hug. 

Due to his great success the song has been covered several times:
 in Saudi Arabic by Inez Atili under the title My Love released in 2020 
 in Levantine Arabic by Fadel Chaker under the title Ya ghayeb
 in Hebrew by Shlomi Saranga and Moshik Afia under the title Halom Matok (Sweet dream) 
in Hebrew duets with Sarit Hadad Tak-tak and Oxygena
 in Turkish by Serdar Ortaç as Beni unut 
 in Serbian by Funky G as Gde si ti and Jelena Karleuša as Nisi u pravu
 in Bulgarian by Azis as Obicham Te. 
 in Bulgarian by Magapasa as Kolko Mi Lipsvash. 
 
In his youth at 13-year-old, he started to learn piano, and roughly 1984 at 14-year-old as a piano player musician he went for work to Düsseldorf, Belgium thereafter, following Munich and other countries. Upon his return to Thessaloniki in 1995, he began singing in different bouzoukia clubs ‒night clubs where Greek music is performed live‒ in provinces across Greece. Subsequently he went to Belgium where was working daily. Returning in 2000 he went to Dubai, United Arab Emirates, where at a nightclub he was working as piano player and singer singing Greek songs, from which there he wrote the lyrics and music for the song How much I miss your warm hug. In 2001, released his first music single and shortly after his first music album, from the Vasipap record label located in Thessaloniki. The song’s success and popularity made him a famous singer across Greece. 

In 2010, Sotis Volanis has spoken openly about to suffer from alcoholism problem stated that he cannot understand how it could have come so far. The revelation on the problem had experienced Sotis Volanis made at Alter Channel’s television show program Zamanfou with presenter Annita Pania, where he said "The reason why I led to the drinking is because I am introvert person and do not express my feelings", and he had promised "I would not take a sip into my mouth." The negative health effects, led him, now sober, to seek treatment and, ultimately, he was able to successfully complete a rehabilitation, and has maintained his sobriety since 2014 returns to his career.

Discography

Albums
 Sotis Volanis (2001)
 Sotis Volanis2 (2002)
 Orkoi Agapis (2003)
 Sotis Live (2004)
 Tak Tak (2005)
 Na M' Agapas (2007)
 Panselinos (2009)
 Po! Po! Po! (2010)
 Epistrefo Anevasmenos (2013)
 Emeis Ama Kollisoume De Tha Xekollisoume (2017)

Singles
 Sexokoritso (2011)
 Agapise Me (2012) 
 Tha To Kano Ola Poutana (2012)
 Den Se Thelo Xana (2014)
 Matia Mou Latremena (2015)
 Venzini (2015)
 Kafes (2016)
 Pou Kai Pou Mataniono (2018)
 Na Me Proseheis (2019)
 Simera Agapaei (2019)
 Krata Me Sfihta (2019)
 Eho Vourkosei (2020)
 Tsigara Gkomenes Pota (2020)
 Megala Salonia Enfant Gate (2020)
 Oh Ti Glykia Pou Einai I Amartia (2020)
 Paraponaki Mou (2021)
 Pano Ap'Ola Se Goustaro (2022)

Duets
 Giati Na Mi Boroume Na Synnenoithoume (Fouli Tzelepi) (2020)

References

External links
  on Discogs
  on YouTube

Greek laïko singers
Greek Romani people
Living people
21st-century Greek male singers
Greek people of Romani descent
Romani singers
1971 births
People from Krya Vrysi, Pella